is a 2018 Japanese mystery thriller directed by Takashi Miike. It is an adaptation of the novel of the same name by Keigo Higashino, published on May 15, 2015.

Plot 
When two people are poisoned with hydrogen sulfide, the police call in the aid of the geochemistry professor Shusuke Aoe to solve the mystery of their deaths.

Cast 
 Shō Sakurai as Shusuke Aoe
 Suzu Hirose as Madoka Uhara
 Sōta Fukushi as Kento Amakasu
 Mirai Shida as Tetsu Okunishi
 Eriko Satō as Chisato Mizuki
 Tao Okamoto as Rei Kirimiya
 Rei Dan as Mina Uhara
 Masanobu Takashima as Toru Takeo
 Lily Franky as Dr. Zentaro Uhara
 Hiroshi Tamaki as Yuji Nakaoka
 Etsushi Toyokawa as Saisei Amakasu

Production 
Filming began on  March 16, 2017, and lasted until April 2017.

Reception
The film received generally negative reviews, with most reviewers pointing out the difference in quality between it and Miike's other work.

In a review for Yahoo! Lifestyle, reviewer Marcus Goh stated that the main problem with the film "is that there's no storytelling whatsoever. Each scene is made up of copious exposition dumps, with absolutely no foreshadowing or setup of what is to happen next. Things happen because the plot dictates it to be so, rather than through the effort of the characters. The mystery is solved because of a convoluted explanation that’s provided to you, with no prior indication that any of this might have been the case." He further criticizes the main actor, writing, "Sakurai's performance is bland and uninspiring, to the point that even he looks bored at the character he’s playing."

In a review for the Canadian magazine Exclaim!, reviewer Laura Di Girolamo concluded that "this is a run-of-the-mill Japanese drama thriller that could have used a bit more of that Miike edge to really make it work."

Reviewer Rob Hunter of Film School Rejects wrote that the film "is a mystery with some mildly supernatural elements, but forget suspenseful — this movie’s not even interesting."

Reviewer J Hurtado of Screen Anarchy wrote that "legendary director Miike Takashi takes a stab at the idea with his adaptation of Higoshino Keigo's novel of the same name makes an attempt that sadly falls far flat of what we've come to expect from this veteran filmmaker."

Reviewer Richard Gray of The Reel Bits called it a "slow-moving adaptation that never quite develops its multiple story threads" and concluded that "at two hours the film long overstays its welcome."

The film earned $10.9 million at the Japanese box office.

References

External links 
 

2010s Japanese films
2018 films
2010s mystery thriller films
Japanese mystery thriller films
2010s Japanese-language films
Japanese detective films
Films based on Japanese novels
Films directed by Takashi Miike
OLM, Inc. films
Warner Bros. films
Films based on works by Keigo Higashino